Klaus Maran (born 4 October 1959 in Bolzano) is an Italian former windsurfer.

Biography
In his career he participated in the 1984 Summer Olympic Games and won the Windsurfing World Championships two times.

Achievements

References

External links
 
 
 

1959 births
Living people
Italian windsurfers
Italian male sailors (sport)
Olympic sailors of Italy
Sailors at the 1984 Summer Olympics – Windglider
Sportspeople from Bolzano